The Wilson School District serves students from the communities of Spring, West Lawn, Sinking Spring, Lower Heidelberg, and the Berkshire Heights section of Wyomissing, and is located in West Lawn, Pennsylvania.  The district operates five elementary schools (Whitfield, Cornwall Terrace, Shiloh Hills, Green Valley, Spring Ridge), two middle schools (Wilson West Middle School, Wilson Southern Middle School), and Wilson High School.

Transportation
Wilson operates 73 vehicles. This includes 49 72 passenger school buses; 2 48 passenger wheel chair accessible school buses; 2 39 passenger wheel chair accessible school buses; 5 mini school buses that carry between 28 and 29 passengers; 5 wheel chair accessible mini school buses that carry between 22 and 24 passengers; and 10 9 passenger school vans.

References

External links
Wilson School District website

School districts in Berks County, Pennsylvania